The Le Touret Memorial is a World War I memorial, located near the former commune of Richebourg-l'Avoué, in the Pas-de-Calais region of France. The memorial lists 13,389 names of British and Commonwealth soldiers with no known grave who were killed in the area prior to the start of the Battle of Loos on 25 September 1915. The exceptions are Canadian soldiers, whose names are commemorated at the Vimy Memorial, and Indian Army soldiers, whose names appear on the Neuve-Chapelle Memorial. Those commemorated on this memorial include the Victoria Cross recipients Abraham Acton, William Anderson, Jacob Rivers, and Edward Barber. Also commemorated here are Clive and Arnold Baxter, brothers who were killed on the same day, 25 January 1915, in the Brickstacks area of Cuinchy.

Designed by J. R. Truelove, the memorial is a loggia surrounding an open rectangular court. The inscription is over the entrance, and given in both French and English. The memorial was unveiled on 22 March 1930 by Lord Tyrrell, a diplomat who was present in his role as British Ambassador to France.

External links
Commonwealth War Graves Commission details of the Le Touret Memorial
Details of battles fought in this area
Description of details of the Le Touret Memorial

Footnotes and references

World War I memorials in France
Buildings and structures completed in 1930
Monuments and memorials in the Pas-de-Calais
Commonwealth War Graves Commission memorials